Celia Christine Gregory (23 September 1949 – 8 September 2008) was a British stage, film and television actress, who became a faith healer later in life.

Best known for her role as Ruth Anderson in the 1976 BBC television drama Survivors, she also appeared in such television series as Hammer House of Horror, The Professionals, Bergerac, Tales of the Unexpected, The Problem of Thor Bridge and Reilly, Ace of Spies, among many others.

She also worked as a stage actress in London's West End opposite Laurence Olivier, Joan Plowright and Frank Finlay in 1973 in Eduardo De Filippo's play, Saturday, Sunday, Monday. In 1991 she played Calphurnia in Julius Caesar and Lady Capulet in Romeo and Juliet for the Royal Shakespeare Company.

She married Keith Bender and they had two sons. The marriage ended in divorce. She retired in 1993 to spend time with her family. Celia Gregory died in 2008, aged 58, from undisclosed causes.

Filmography

References

External links
 
 Obituary in The Guardian
 Obituary in The Stage 

1949 births
2008 deaths
English film actresses
English stage actresses
English television actresses
Actresses from London
Place of death missing
20th-century British businesspeople